Hog Mountain is a mountain located in the Catskill Mountains of New York northeast of Arkville. Fleischmann Mountain is located south and Morris Hill is located southwest of Hog Mountain.

References

Mountains of Delaware County, New York
Mountains of New York (state)